Joshua David Rees (born 4 October 1993) is an English professional footballer who plays for Boreham Wood as a midfielder.

Club career

Arsenal
Rees joined Arsenal as a schoolboy and worked his way through the side's academy, until he left the club at the end of the 2012–13 season. He was loaned to the Brentford Development Squad during the latter stages of the 2012–13 season.

Nottingham Forest
Rees joined Nottingham Forest's youth team in 2013 and made his debut for the club as a 76th-minute substitute in a 2–1 defeat to Brighton & Hove Albion on 3 May 2014. Having made no further appearances for the club, it was announced on 25 May 2016 that Rees would be released by Nottingham Forest at the end of the season. While at the City Ground he was loaned to National League clubs Nuneaton Town and Torquay United.

Chelmsford City
Rees signed for National League South club Chelmsford City on 19 August 2016. He made 49 appearances and scored seven goals during the 2016–17 season and was a part of the squad which won the Essex Senior Cup.

Bromley
Rees joined National League club Bromley on 20 June 2017. He made 55 appearances and scored 20 goals during the 2017–18 season and was a part of the team which lost on penalties in the 2018 FA Trophy Final.

Gillingham
On 12 June 2018 he returned to the EFL by signing for League One club Gillingham. In August 2019 his contract with the club was terminated.

Return to Bromley
Following his departure from the Gills, he immediately returned to former club Bromley.

Aldershot Town
On 28 July 2020, Rees joined National League rivals Aldershot Town ahead of the 2020-21 season.

Boreham Wood
On 1 July 2021, Rees joined fellow National League side Boreham Wood on a two-year deal.

Personal life 
Rees attended Hadleigh Community Primary School and Southend High School for Boys.

He holds a first class honours degree in Sports Science awarded in 2018 by Manchester Metropolitan University.

Honours 
Chelmsford City
 Essex Senior Cup: 2015–16

Bromley
FA Trophy runner-up: 2017–18

England U16
 Victory Shield: 2008

Career statistics

References

External links

Josh Rees at TheFA.com

1993 births
Living people
People educated at Southend High School for Boys
English footballers
England youth international footballers
Association football midfielders
Arsenal F.C. players
Brentford F.C. players
Nottingham Forest F.C. players
Nuneaton Borough F.C. players
Torquay United F.C. players
Chelmsford City F.C. players
Bromley F.C. players
Gillingham F.C. players
Aldershot Town F.C. players
Boreham Wood F.C. players
English Football League players
National League (English football) players